Der Bettelstudent or The Beggar Student is an operetta in three acts by Carl Millöcker.

The Beggar Student may also refer to:

 The Beggar Student (1927 film)
 The Beggar Student (1931 British film)
 The Beggar Student (1931 German film)
 The Beggar Student (1936 film)
 The Beggar Student (1956 film)